Meletis "Takis" Persias is a retired Greek football player who was active during the 1970s and 1980s.

Career
Persias was born on 9 December 1957 in Piraeus, Greece. He played for Olympiakos in the period 1976–1985. In 1985 he signed with OFI Crete. Persias played for the Cretans between 1985 and 1988. He ended his career at Levadiakos in 1989.

Honours
OFI
 Greek Cup: 1986–87

Olympiacos
 Alpha Ethniki: 1980–81, 1981–82, 1982–83
 Greek Cup: 1980–81

References

External links
 Οι "Αθλητικές Ιστορίες" στην Αθήνα για τον Τάκη Περσία

Greek footballers
Greece international footballers
Olympiacos F.C. players
Super League Greece players
OFI Crete F.C. players
Levadiakos F.C. players
Association football midfielders
1957 births
Living people
Olympiacos F.C. managers
PAOK FC non-playing staff
Greek football managers
Footballers from Piraeus